Holmia may refer to:
 Holmia (Cilicia), a town of ancient Cilicia, now in Turkey
 Holmia, the Latin name of Stockholm
 Holmia, a residential area in the centre of Stockholm, on the island Kungsholmen
 Holmia, the vernacular name of Holmium(III) oxide
378 Holmia, an asteroid
Holmia (trilobite), a trilobite belonging to the Olenellina suborder